The Ukrainian Embassy in Chișinău is the diplomatic mission of Ukraine in the Republic of Moldova. The embassy building is located at Vasile Lupu 17 in Chișinău. Ukrainian Ambassador to the Republic of Moldova has been Marko Shevchenko since 2020.

History 

Marko Shevchenko, ambassador since 2020.

After the collapse of the Soviet Union, Ukraine declared itself independent in August 1991. On December 21, 1991, Ukraine recognized the independence of the Republic of Moldova. Diplomatic relations were established on March 10, 1992. The embassy in Chișinău was opened in 1993. The first ambassador was Boyko Vitaly. Marko Shevchenko has been accredited as Ukrainian ambassador to the Republic of Moldova since February 2020.

About  , of it constitutes the de facto border between Ukraine and the unrecognized breakaway republic of Transnistria.

In the cultural and humanitarian field, there are regular projects between neighbouring countries, including Transnistria. The Culture and Information Center (CIC) has been set up in the embassy since April 2007. Television and radio broadcast a weekly program in Ukrainian. In terms of association law, the Republic of Moldova has a Ukrainian Community and a Society for Ukrainian Culture.

Tasks of the Embassy 

The main task of the Embassy of Ukraine in Chișinău is to represent the interests of Ukraine, to promote the development of political, economic, cultural, scientific, and other ties, as well as to protect the rights and interests of citizens and legal entities of Ukraine located in Moldova.

The Embassy promotes the development of interstate relations between Ukraine and Moldova at all levels, to ensure the harmonious development of mutual relations, as well as cooperation on issues of mutual interest. The embassy also performs consular functions.

History of diplomatic relations 
Ukraine recognized the independence of the Republic of Moldova on December 21, 1991. Diplomatic relations between the Republic of Moldova and Ukraine were established on March 10, 1992.

Consulate of Ukraine in Bălți 

A second consulate was established in Bălți in March 2006.

 Address: Kyiv Street, 143, Bălți, 3121, Moldova.

Consular district: Bălți municipality; districts: Briceni, Glodeni, Donduşeni, Drochia, Edineţ, Camenca, Ocnița, Rezina, Rîbnița, Rîșcani, Sîngerei, Soroca, Telenești, Fălești, Florești, Șoldănești.

Institutions in Transnistria

"Ukrainian House" in Tiraspol 
In March 2010 the “Український дім” (Ukrainian House) was opened in Tiraspol.

In Transnistria, Ukrainian has the status of a third official language.
The mission is located at Vasile Lupu 17 west of the centre of Tiraspol.
 Address: Engels Avenue, 15, Tiraspol, 3121, Moldova.

Heads of diplomatic mission 

 Siluyan Andreevich Muzhilovsky (1649)
 Filon Prokopovich Dzhelaliy (1650)
 Vitaliy Boiko (1993–1994), Ambassador
 Eugene Viktorovich Levitsky (1994–1996), chargé d'affaires.
 Ivan Mykolayovych Hnatyshyn (1996–2000)
 Teofil Georgievich Rendyuk (2000), chargé d'affaires
 Peter Fedorovich Chaly (2000–2007)
 Sergey Ivanovich Pirozhkov (2007–2014)
 Gennady Valentinovich Altukhov (2014–2015), chargé d'affaires
 Ivan Mykolayovych Hnatyshyn (2015–2019), second rotation
 Marko Oleksandrovych Shevchenko (2019-)

See also 

Moldova–Ukraine relations
List of diplomatic missions of Ukraine
List of diplomatic missions in Moldova
Embassy of Moldova, Kyiv

References 

Moldova–Ukraine relations
Chisinau
Ukraine